Rogoźnica  is a village which was until 31 December 2019 in the administrative district of Gmina Głogów Małopolski, within Rzeszów County, Subcarpathian Voivodeship, in south-eastern Poland. From 1 January 2020 it became part of the town of Głogów Małopolski.

References

Villages in Rzeszów County
Neighbourhoods in Poland